Kevin Alexander Stephens (born 28 July 1984) is an English former professional footballer who most recently played for Boreham Wood. He played as a defender for Leyton Orient in the Football League. In 2009, Stephens refused to play for Newport County again after opposition striker, Stuart Douglas, received racist abuse from Newport fans in the stadium.

Under the name "Stevo the Madman" he has gained attention for videos on Snapchat.

Career

Leyton Orient 
Stephens started his footballing career at Football League Third Division side Leyton Orient as a trainee in 2001. He made his first of four league appearances for the club, all of them away from home, in a 3–2 defeat away to York City on 9 November 2002, a game in which he received a booking. His second appearance was on 18 March 2003 in a 3–1 defeat at A.F.C. Bournemouth, in which he was substituted in the 89th minute for Gabriel Zakuani. His final appearance in the 2002–03 season was in a 1–0 defeat at Southend United on 22 March 2003, coming on as a substitute in the 65th minute for Simon Downer.

His final league appearance for the club would be in the 2003–04 season when he came on as an 82nd minute substitute for Matt Joseph in a 1–1 draw at Mansfield Town on 16 August 2003. Stephens was then loaned out for one month to Billericay Town in the Isthmian League Premier Division, after impressing in a pre-season friendly between Orient and Billericay.

He went on to play for Redbridge, Enfield Town, Chelmsford City, and Boreham Wood.

Newport County 
Stephens was one of three defenders manager Dean Holdsworth brought with him from Isthmian League Division One North club Redbridge to Conference South side Newport County at the start of the 2008-09 season, along with left-back David Collins and centre-back Nick Skelton. In his first two months at the club, he was regarded as their most consistent and impressive outfield player. However, just three months after signing, all three former Redbridge players were released by Newport County. Holdsworth wanted to keep Stephens, but the board decided that paying his travel expenses from his home in London would not be feasible.

Stephens was re-signed by the club later in the same season . He left the club in March 2009 after vowing to never play for them again after hearing racist chants from his own fans directed at Bath City striker Stuart Douglas in Newport's 4–0 loss at home to Bath.

Career statistics

After football 
While working as a recovery driver, Stephens constantly filmed his day-to-day life as a 'van man' which saw the inception of 'StevoTheMadMan'. Stephens has been featured on numerous TV shows. Between 2016-2020, he was a regular host of a YouTube series for JD Sports called Take a Bow. The show saw its hosts discuss the latest football news, matches and gossip on a weekly basis.

In January 2019, Stephens, coupled with music artist Big Narstie finished 3rd in the fourth series of Celebrity Coach Trip. 

During December 2019, Stephens also starred in the Come Dine with Me Christmas special in a bid to win £1,000 for charity over a week of competitive cooking and hosting.  Also in December 2019, Stephens appeared on comedy, music and talk show The Big Narstie Show with friend Big Narstie and comedian Mo Gilligan where they discussed his content and upcoming projects.

He covered the 2020 Super Bowl for BBC Sport on the opening night - interviewing the players, teams and coaches ahead of the game.

In June 2021, Stephens was a featured artist on the song Come On England by Plain Old Kev. The music video for the song has cameos from former England international footballers Rio Ferdinand, Peter Crouch and Sol Campbell, as well as music artists Example, Olly Murs, Joel Corry and Danny Howard. The song peaked at #78 on the British iTunes Chart. 

In February 2022, it was announced that Stephens would be part of the cast of E4 cooking show Celebrity Cooking School.

Filmography

References

External links

1984 births
Living people
Footballers from Enfield, London
English footballers
Association football defenders
Leyton Orient F.C. players
Billericay Town F.C. players
Hornchurch F.C. players
Redbridge F.C. players
Newport County A.F.C. players
Enfield Town F.C. players
Boreham Wood F.C. players
English Football League players
British video bloggers
Chelmsford City F.C. players
Black British sportsmen
Black British comedians